= Samuel Traina =

American environmental chemist

Samuel Traina is an American environmental chemist and a founder of The Sierra Nevada Research Institute whose work used to be funded by the National Science Foundation, the United States Department of Energy and the United States Environmental Protection Agency. He also a member of various committees such as the Earth Resources Committee and National Research Council. From 1985 to 2002 he was faculty member of the Ohio State University and was a co-director of the Environmental Molecular Science Institute.
